Katensen can mean:

 Katensen, Offen, part of the town Offen, Bergen
 Katensen, Uetze, part of the town Uetze